The discography of Mercyful Fate, a Danish heavy metal band, consists of seven studio releases, three compilations, three singles, and six music videos. Mercyful Fate was formed in 1981 by vocalist King Diamond and guitarist Hank Shermann. After several line-up changes and self-made demos, Mercyful Fate released their self-titled EP in 1982, with the line-up of King Diamond (vocals), Hank Shermann (guitar), Michael Denner (guitar), Timi Hansen (bass) and Kim Ruzz (drums). With this line-up, the group released their debut album, Melissa, on 30 October 1983 through Roadrunner Records. The following year, Mercyful Fate recorded their second album Don't Break the Oath. Released on 7 September 1984, the album debuted at number 33 on the Swedish Sverigetopplistan charts. Despite winning a cult following around the world, with sales in the thousands, Mercyful Fate broke up in April 1985, due to musical differences.

In 1993, King Diamond, Hank Shermann, Michael Denner and Timi Hansen reunited to reform Mercyful Fate (drummer Kim Ruzz was replaced by Morten Nielsen). On 22 June 1993, Mercyful Fate released the album In the Shadows through Metal Blade Records. Following the supporting tour, the band released The Bell Witch on 27 June 1994, an EP of live tracks, as well as studio recordings from In the Shadows. On 25 September 1994, Mercyful Fate released the album Time, which was followed by Into the Unknown in 1996. Into the Unknown also charted at number 31 on Finnish album charts. On 9 June 1998 Mercyful Fate released the album Dead Again, and on 15 May 1999 the band released the album 9.

Albums

Studio albums

Compilation albums

Extended plays

Singles

Music videos

References 

Heavy metal group discographies
Discographies of Danish artists